The 1996 Cupa României Final was the 58th final of Romania's most prestigious cup competition. The final was played at the Stadionul Naţional in Bucharest on 28 April 1996 and was contested between Divizia A sides Steaua București and Gloria Bistriţa. The cup was won by Steaua.

Route to the final

Match details

References

External links
 Official site 

Cupa
Cupa României Finals
FC Steaua București matches